The People's Party – Dan Diaconescu (abbreviated PP-DD) was a populist political party in Romania created in 2011 by television presenter Dan Diaconescu. In June 2015 it merged into the National Union for the Progress of Romania (UNPR) after Diaconescu was convicted of extortion.

History 

The People's Party – Dan Diaconescu was founded in 2011 by Romanian TV presenter Dan Diaconescu. The first congress of the party was held in January 2012, when the party was officially constituted. At the 2012 local election, the PP-DD came in third, on the party's ticket being 31 mayors, 3,126 local councilors, and 134 county councilors were elected.

At the 2012 parliamentary election, the PP-DD came in third again, successfully entering Parliament with 21 senators and 47 deputies. After the election, the party became the fourth largest political force in Romania, after the Social Democrats (PSD), the National Liberals (PNL), and the Democrat Liberals (PDL). 

By June 2013 however, the party became heavily affected by party switching, losing 2 senators and 16 deputies, including its group leaders in both chambers.

The PP-DD subsequently merged into the National Union for the Progress of Romania (UNPR) on 29 June 2015.

Ideology
The ideology of the PP-DD expressed nationalist and socialist sentiments. The party supported progressive measures like higher retirement pensions and salaries, and a lower VAT. The party also supported the collectivization of agriculture and the foundation of state companies with directly elected leadership, and sought a People's Tribunal.

European affiliation 

On 21 May 2013, PP-DD publicized their collaboration with the EUDemocrats party.

Structure

Leadership
 Dan Diaconescu

Electoral history

Legislative elections

Presidential elections

European elections

External links
  Official site

References

2011 establishments in Romania
2015 disestablishments in Romania
Defunct nationalist parties
Defunct socialist parties in Romania
Left-wing nationalist parties
Nationalist parties in Romania
Political parties disestablished in 2015
Political parties established in 2011
Romanian nationalist parties